Char Rajibpur is an upazila of Kurigram District in the Division of Rangpur, Bangladesh.

Geography
It has 11,124 households and a total area 111.03 km2.

Demographics
As of the 2011 Bangladesh census, Char Rajibpur has a population of 73,307.
According to the 11th National Assembly elections, Rajibpur upazila has a total of 54 thousand 79 voters. Among them there are 26 thousand 535 male voters and 27 thousand 544 female voters

Administration
Char Rajibpur Upazila is divided into three union parishads: Rajibpur, Kodalkati, and Mohongonj. The union parishads are subdivided into 26 mauzas and 99 villages.

Famous People

Taramon Bibi

See also
 Upazilas of Bangladesh
 Districts of Bangladesh
 Divisions of Bangladesh

References

Upazilas of Kurigram District